Naranjos is the municipal seat of Naranjos Amatlán in Veracruz, Mexico.

Demographics
The population is 20,073.

References

Populated places in Veracruz